Clara Parkes is an American author, yarn critic, and wool expert. Parkes has been described as "quite possibly the only writer you will ever read who can make a discussion of micron counts absolutely riveting."

Career

Parkes was taught to knit aged eight, by her grandmother. After graduating from Mills College, Parkes began her career in high tech publishing in San Francisco before moving to Maine and launching her online magazine Knitter's Review in 2000. In 2012 she purchased a 676 lb. bale of American Merino wool and began a crowd-funded project known as The Great White Bale, in which she chronicled the process of turning the raw wool into finished yarn. This project led to the creation of her own small-batch yarn company, Clara Yarn. She is a Certified Level 1 Wool Classer, and a member of the American Sheep Industry Association.

Parkes appeared in the Yarn Spotlight segment on the 9th, 10th, and 11th seasons of Knitting Daily TV, a television show produced by Interweave Press for PBS. 

In March 2020, Parkes launched The Daily Respite, a brief daily general-interest newsletter via the Substack platform. Her current undertaking is The Wool Channel, a multimedia effort to raise awareness and appreciation of wool. The Wool Channel outlets include a free newsletter and YouTube channel; paid members also have access to a long-form newsletter, a community app, and video content.

Knitter's Review 
In 2000 Parkes founded Knitter's Review, a knitting review website which became a major social media resource for knitters before the advent of Ravelry. Using her experience creating the website Tech Shopper and technology acquired from the Quilter's Review, she began to publish product reviews, a weekly newsletter, and created an interactive user forum. At its peak, the Knitter's Review Forums had over 70,000 members. For several years Knitter's Review sponsored a fundraising drive for Heifer International, raising in excess of $47,000. In 2002 members of the forums created a small, in-person gathering that grew into a larger annual event known as the Knitter's Review Retreat. By the time of the final Knitter's Review Retreat in 2015 it had become known as a  "bucket list" item for knitters. In 2015 she retired the old Knitter's Review site and forums, although many of her reviews and articles are still available at the site.

Writing

Parkes is the author of seven books: the trilogy The Knitter's Book of...; the memoir The Yarn Whisperer, the travel memoir Knitlandia, and Vanishing Fleece, which chronicles her experience as a yarn producer. In addition, she edited the collection of essays A Stash of One's Own.

Her travel memoir Knitlandia: A Knitter Sees the World appeared on the New York Times bestseller list for travel books in 2016.

She edited the anthology A Stash of One's Own: Knitters on Loving, Living with, and Letting go of Yarn, a collection of essays by knitting experts including Meg Swansen, Stephanie Pearl-McPhee, and Debbie Stoller. It was named one of the top 10 lifestyle books for fall 2017 by Publishers Weekly.

She is the narrator of the audiobooks The Yarn Whisperer: My Unexpected Life in Knitting, Knitlandia: A Knitter Sees the World, and Vanishing Fleece: Adventures in American Wool.

Personal life

Parkes lives in Portland, Maine.

Bibliography 
 The Knitter's Book of Yarn. Potter Craft Books. 2007. 
 The Knitter's Book of Wool. Potter Craft Books. 2009. 
 The Knitter's Book of Socks. Potter Craft Books. 2011. 
 The Yarn Whisperer: My Unexpected Life in Knitting. Stewart Tabori & Chang. 2013. 
 Knitlandia: A Knitter Sees the World.  Stewart Tabori & Chang. 2016. 
 Parkes, Clara ed. (2017) A Stash of One's Own: Knitters on Loving, Living with, and Letting Go of Yarn. Abrams Press. 
 Vanishing Fleece: Adventures in American Wool. Abrams Press. October 2019

References

Women textile artists
American textile artists
Mills College alumni
Artists from Portland, Maine
Year of birth missing (living people)
Living people
People in knitting
21st-century American women writers
21st-century American women artists
21st-century textile artists